The New York State Summer School of the Arts (NYSSSA) is a series of summer residential programs for New York State high school students. It provides intensive pre-professional training. It is open to all New York State high school age students who qualify through audition. Seven component schools offer training in the specific disciplines of ballet, choral studies, dance, media arts, orchestral studies, theatre and visual arts.

Schools

Ballet
Students are housed at Skidmore College in Saratoga Springs, New York, close to the National Museum of Dance and the Saratoga Performing Arts Center, which hosts the New York City Ballet during the summer. The program is under the direction of NYCB Principal Jenifer Ringer. Students work every day with members of the NYCB and attend all of the company's performances at night. The School of Ballet also presents lectures on dance and career opportunities led by the staff and guest artists from around the world. Students receive intensive instruction in ballet, pointe, character, jazz, variations, and pas de deux. The dancers also partake in a physical therapy program.

Choral studies
The School of Choral Studies is takes place at SUNY Fredonia, where students are led in daily chorus and private voice training, as well as given lessons in musical theater, opera, small ensembles, and voice recital. Students perform in the Roche Recital Hall in Mason Hall at SUNY Fredonia, as well as the Amphitheater at the nearby Chautauqua Institute. Classes are led by a highly skilled  staff of professional music instructors from around the U.S.. Students are also encouraged to enjoy concerts, operas, and many other social events planned by the staff at NYSSSA.

Dance
The School of Dance takes place at Skidmore College during the latter half of the summer, after the Ballet program is completed. Instruction takes place in the dance studios of the National Museum of Dance and the Skidmore Dance Theatre. Classes provide instruction in modern dance technique, composition, music for dance, career possibilities, repertory and performance. In addition to the staff and faculty, guest artists attend many nights a week. Workshop performances are also offered to the students, as well as trips to the National Museum of Dance and the Saratoga Performing Arts Center.

Media arts
The School of Media Arts takes place at Alfred State College, in Alfred, New York for four weeks in July. The program includes classes in video, filmmaking, photography, computer graphic arts, and new media, with courses providing a review of fundamentals of the craft, overview of aesthetics, and surveys of contemporary work, trends, and ideas, as well as giving students an opportunity to use professional equipment and facilities. Students work on a number of projects, both individually and collaboratively, throughout the four weeks of the program. While the curriculum stresses creative production, it is not exclusively goal-oriented. Exploration, experimentation, and discovery are stressed in each project. The program culminates with a final show and screening.

Orchestral studies
The School of Orchestral Studies takes place at Skidmore College, and is cosponsored by the New York State School Music Association, the Saratoga Performing Arts Center, and the Philadelphia Orchestra. Students have the ability to take seminars in topics such as musicianship, free improvisation, and practice techniques. In addition to the full orchestra, a string orchestra and a wind ensemble, as well as other small ensembles, are available for students to perform in. Over the course of the program students participate in a number of performances, including shows in the Empire Plaza in front of the state capital and at the Saratoga Performing Arts Center. The program's repertoire is arranged in conjunction to the Philadelphia Orchestra's summer repertoire and many of the small ensembles give concerts before the Philadelphia Orchestra's SPAC performances. Additionally, the students have weekly coaching sessions with members of the Philadelphia Orchestra.

Theatre
The School of Theatre takes place over 4 weeks during July at SUNY Delhi. Students are given daily courses in improvisation, movement, voice and scene study. Guest artists and performers also provide master classes, readings, and workshops in diverse areas, such as stage combat, comedy and improvisation, mask, play writing, and directing. Students are also taken on field trips to New York City to see on and off-Broadway plays. In addition to their rigorous course load, students write and direct plays, as well as perform in fellow students’ work.

The School of Theatre is a summer intensive conservatory program. The students take six hours of rigorous classes daily and attend nightly workshops for 3 hours, along with assigned reading and out of class homework assignments. Much of voice and movement study is rooted in the Alexander technique. The scene study curriculum leads a daily hour and a half Meisner technique class that delves into the process of repetition, eventually applying activities, given circumstances, and eventually scene work. The improvisation class derives from Konstantin Stanislavski's teachings and Michael Chekhov's work. Students are required to read Stanislavski's book An Actor Prepares, as well as William Esper's The Actor's Art and Craft. 

Admission to the School of Theatre is by a competitive audition. 32 students are selected to participate. The audition consists of two contrasting monologues and an interview.

Visual arts
The School of the Arts takes place at SUNY Fredonia during the month of July, where students work in the studio with   drawing, painting, printmaking, sculpture, mixed media, figure, and inter-disciplinary arts under the direction of noted exhibiting artists/educators. Related activities include drawing and painting from a live model, trips to farms and lakes in the area, and experience with art processes that include welding, casting, direct carving, modeling life-size objects in clay, and experimenting with a variety of printmaking techniques. Group critiques and discussions of student work provide feedback throughout the program.

History
The New York State Summer School of the Arts was established in 1971, under Governor Nelson A. Rockefeller, opening with the Orchestral Studies program.  In 1976 the School was expanded with the addition of Ballet, Choral, Theater, Media Arts, and Visual Arts programs. NYSSSA was expanded further in 1988 with the Dance and Jazz programs.

Application
Placement in the schools is reserved for New York State residents who meet the selection criteria.  If there are remaining openings after this selection, they may be filled by out-of-state students who meet additional criteria. Students must be enrolled in grades 8 through 12 and students must audition for the NYSSSA School they wish to attend. This audition is completed in person at a regional audition site, through a portfolio review, or in certain instances, through a video or audiotape review.
Tuition for the schools is $2,500 which includes, room, board and classes and artistic events for the four-week residential program. State funds keep these tuitions considerably lower than the actual program costs.
Students are selected for the NYSSSA schools without regard to their financial need and tuition assistance forms are mailed to each student who is offered acceptance or alternate status for each program. NYSSSA awards financial assistance based upon individual need, but is limited to New York State residents only. Auditions are held throughout the state.

Notable alumni

• David Heiss (Orchestral ’71) - Cellist with the Metropolitan Opera since 1982, Principal Cellist with the New York Pops since 1989.

• Jace Alexander (Theater 1980) – Television director (Rescue Me, Burn Notice, Law & Order)

• Philip Seymour Hoffman (Theater ’84) – Oscar-winning actor (Capote), nominated for Best Supporting Actor (Charlie Wilson's War), as well as an accomplished stage actor and director.

• Dan Futterman (Theater ’84) – Accomplished actor (The Birdcage, A Mighty Heart, TV's Judging Amy) and nominated for Best Adapted Screenplay (Capote).

• Bennett Miller (Theater ’84) – Film director (The Cruise, Moneyball, Foxcatcher), nominated for Best Director (Capote).

• David Devlin (Media Arts ’86) – Lighting Director (The Lost World: Jurassic Park, Amistad, Saving Private Ryan, Psycho, A.I. Artificial Intelligence, Minority Report, Catch Me If You Can, The Terminal, War of the Worlds, Shine a Light, Indiana Jones and the Kingdom of the Crystal Skull)

• Julianne Jordan (Orchestral ’86) – Music Supervisor (TMNT, Mr. & Mrs. Smith, The Bourne Identity, Go)

• Paris Wilcox (Ballet 1987, ’88, '89) – Principal dancer with the Kansas City Ballet.

• Danielle Huben (Choral Studies ’90) – Performed as Rapunzel in 2002 Broadway revival of Into the Woods

• Curt Markham (Media Arts ’90) – Director of the Rochester International Film Festival and digital filmmaker.

• Vanessa Carlton (Ballet ’92) – Pop singer; hits include Grammy-nominated single "A Thousand Miles."

• Graham Goddard (Visual Arts ’95) – Contemporary artist; exhibitions include the Skirball Museum and the California African American Museum.

• Jon-Erik Goldberg (Ballet ’93, ’94, ’95, '96) – Performer for national tour of Mamma Mia! and Cats.

• Jeremy Cushman (Orchestral ’08) – violin soloist, serving as concertmaster for the 2008 class.

See also
 Empire State Youth Orchestra
 Music school
 National Conference of Governor's Schools

References

Education in New York (state)
Gifted education
Summer schools
Governor's Schools
New York State Education Department
Dance in New York (state)